Ami Yamato (born October 26 in Tokyo, Japan) is a Japanese virtual YouTube vlogger. In her videos, she vlogs from the perspective of a 3D-animated character who does not seem to realize that she is animated. She is based in London, England, having originally moved there from Japan in the spring of 2011. Her videos deal with topics like her love of Starbucks and her light-hearted perspective on the world. She has produced a series of parodies called "Mash-Ins" where she edits herself into popular movies and TV shows, changing the narrative with a comical twist. 

She has collaborated with other YouTubers such as Captain Disillusion on a Back to the Future-themed video., Natalie Tran (Community Channel), Jaiden Animations, LetMeExplain Studios, Domics, Thomas Ridgewell (TomSka), Shutter Authority, and Sneaky Zebra. She was nominated for the "Vlogger of the Year" award at the 11th Shorty Awards.

References

External links

1985 births
Living people
Japanese animators
Japanese women animators
Japanese emigrants to the United Kingdom
Vlogs-related YouTube channels
VTubers
Virtual influencers
Japanese YouTubers
YouTube channels launched in 2011